Yoshiteru is a masculine Japanese given name.

Possible writings
Yoshiteru can be written using different combinations of kanji characters. Here are some examples: 

義輝, "justice, sparkle"
義照, "justice, illuminate"
義央, "justice, center"
吉輝, "good luck, sparkle"
吉照, "good luck, illuminate"
吉央, "good luck, center"
善輝, "virtuous, sparkle"
善照, "virtuous, illuminate"
善央, "virtuous, center"
芳輝, "virtuous, sparkle"
芳照, "virtuous/fragrant, illuminate"
芳央, "virtuous/fragrant, center"
好照, "good/like something, illuminate"
慶輝, "congratulate, preserve"
慶照, "congratulate, illuminate"
慶央, "congratulate, center"
由照, "reason, illuminate"
由輝, "reason, sparkle"

The name can also be written in hiragana よしてる or katakana ヨシテル.

Notable people with the name

, Japanese Go player
, Japanese daimyō
Yoshiteru Ashikaga (足利 義輝, 1536–1565), Japanese shōgun
, Japanese badminton player
, Japanese long-distance runner
, Japanese artist
, Japanese rower
, Japanese footballer

Japanese masculine given names